Bruce Peake (27 January 1937 – 31 July 2022) was an Australian rules footballer who played with Geelong in the Victorian Football League (VFL).

Notes

External links 

1937 births
2022 deaths
Australian rules footballers from Victoria (Australia)
Geelong Football Club players